Parinay (literally Espousal) is a 1974 Indian Hindi-language film directed by Kantilal Rathod and produced by Samantar Chitra. The film starred Romesh Sharma and Shabana Azmi, with Asha Sachdev, Dinesh Thakur, Priti Ganguly and T.P. Jain in the supporting cast. Released on 1 January 1974, this film was associated with Saregama (known as "The Gramophone Company of India Limited" at that time). The screenplay was by Rathod and Shukla, whereas the cinematography was by K. K. Mahajan.

Written by the trio of Vinay Shukla, Rathod and Harin Mehta, Parinay won the 1974 Nargis Dutt Award for Best Feature Film on National Integration (known as the "Rajat Kamal Special Award for the Best Feature Film on National Integration" at that time) presented by the Directorate of Film Festivals (DFF). The DFF also gave Samantar Chitra Private Limited a Rajat Kamal (Silver Lotus), and a certificate; Rathod got a Rajat Kamal, and a certificate. Azmi and Sharma got a medallion each by the DFF.

Cast
Romesh Sharma
Shabana Azmi
Asha Sachdev
Dinesh Thakur
Priti Ganguly
T.P. Jain

Plot 
Ram, an idealist, has one ambition to do something good for his village. Rekha, a rich girl, falls in love with Ram and takes up a job as a tour guide in the city so that they can be together.

Soundtrack

Jaidev was the music director; Anup Jalota, Manna Dey and Vani Jairam were the singers. The lyricists were Ramanand Sharma and Naqsh Lyallpuri. The most popular song of the film, Jaise Suraj Ki Garmi Se, was sung by Sharma bandhu.

See also
List of Bollywood films of 1974

References

External links

1974 films
1970s Hindi-language films
Best Film on National Integration National Film Award winners